Grand Master's Palace most often refers to:

 Palace of the Grand Master of the Knights of Rhodes, Greece
 Grandmaster's Palace, Valletta, Malta

Grand Master's Palace may also refer to:
 Magisterial Palace at Fort St. Angelo, Birgu, Malta
 Verdala Palace, Buskett, Malta
 San Anton Palace, Attard, Malta
 Grand Master's Summer Residence at Ġnien is-Sultan, Valletta, Malta (demolished)
 Palazzo Vilhena, Mdina, Malta
 Casa Leoni, Santa Venera, Malta

See also
 Grand Palace (disambiguation)
 Palace (disambiguation)